Robert Schnakenberg (born March 19, 1969)  is a self-styled “author and raconteur” from Brooklyn, New York. He is best known for writing biographical comic books, as well as a series of popular reference books about entertainment, sports, and world history.

Career

Comic books 
Schnakenberg began his career in the early 1990s as the head writer for Personality Comics, an independent publisher specializing in biographical comic books. He authored more than 50 comic books under a variety of pseudonyms, including the popular Spoof Comics parodies Fantastic Femmes and X-Babes. He created the superheroine Headlights and authored the groundbreaking AIDS awareness superhero comic Healthman.  His 1992 comic book Soul Trek, a humorous mash-up of  Star Trek and Soul Train, is part of the permanent collection of The Museum of Uncut Funk, a virtual museum “dedicated to the celebration and preservation of the Funk.” 

Schnakenberg's artistic collaborators during this period included Allan Jacobsen, Adam Pollina, Ron Joseph, Ken Becker, Garrett Berner, Keith Quinn, Scott Harrison, and Kirk Lindo. Schnakenberg also wrote sports comics for Personality's main competitor, Revolutionary Comics.

After retiring from comic book publishing in 1994, Schnakenberg returned to the field in 2010 as a freelance contributor for the biographical comic book company Bluewater Productions. He authored the popular Michelle Obama: Year One comic along with biographies of Supreme Court Justice Sonia Sotomayor, telejournalist Barbara Walters, and others.

Schnakenberg is the subject of a forthcoming monograph entitled Lunacy and Sorrow: The Life and Art of Robert Schnakenberg, to be published in 2023 by SUNY/Brockport University Press.

Books 
Since the mid-1990s, Schnakenberg has worked primarily as a writer and self-described “intellectual gadabout” covering topics in sports, entertainment, and history.  He is the author of more than a dozen books, including The Encyclopedia Shatnerica (an A-to-Z reference about the life and career of William Shatner), Christopher Walken A-to-Z, and the New York Times bestseller The Big Bad Book of Bill Murray.  His 2010 book, Old Man Drinks, was praised for evoking "the simple, timeless aspects of masculine drinking culture."

In 2014, Schnakenberg adopted the "kid-friendly alter ego" David Stabler.

Published works 
 The Encyclopedia Shatnerica (1998: 2nd Edition: 2008)
 Distory: A Treasury of Historical Insults (2004)
 I (Heart) My Truck (2005)
 Sci-Fi Baby Names (2007)
 Secret Lives of Great Authors (2008)
 Christopher Walken A-to-Z (2008)
 Secret Lives of the Supreme Court (2009)
 Secret Lives of Great Filmmakers (2009)
 Old Man Drinks (2010)
 The Underground Baseball Encyclopedia (2010)
 DC Comics 75th Anniversary Poster Book (2010)
 The Underground Football Encyclopedia (2011)
 Crazy Sh*t Presidents Said (2012)
 Kid Presidents: True Tales of Childhood from America's Presidents (2014)
 Kid Athletes: True Tales of Childhood from Sports Legends (2015)
 The Big Bad Book of Bill Murray (2015)
 Kid Artists: True Tales of Childhood from Creative Legends (2016)
 Kid Authors: True Tales of Childhood from Famous Writers (2017)
 Kid Scientists: True Tales of Childhood from Science Superstars (2018)
 Who Is Dale Earnhardt Jr.? (2022)
 Who Is Jimmy Carter? (2022)

References

External links 
 Museum of Uncut Funk: Soul Trek

1969 births
Living people
American male writers